Vito Dumas (September 26, 1900 – March 28, 1965) was an Argentine single-handed sailor.

On 27 June 1942, while the world was in the depths of World War II, he set out on a single-handed circumnavigation of the Southern Ocean.  He left Buenos Aires in June, sailing LEHG II, a 31-foot ketch an acronym representing "four names which marked my life".  He had only the most basic and makeshift gear; he had no radio, for fear of being shot as a spy, and was forced to stuff his clothes with newspaper to keep warm.

With only three landfalls, the legs of his trip were the longest that had been made by a single-hander, and in the most ferocious oceans on the Earth; but most of all, it was a powerful retort to a world which had chosen to divide itself by war. He recounted the experience in his book Los Cuarenta Bramadores: La Vuelta al Mundo Por la "Ruta Imposible" (Alone Through The Roaring Forties).

He donated his boat to the Argentine Navy for training, but after a few years it was neglected, and was finally wrecked against a pier at the entrance of La Plata's port in 1966. A wealthy Argentine yachtsman paid to have it restored and donated it to the Argentina Naval Museum in Tigre, a coastal river town on a backwater of the River Plate. The LEHG II is now on display in Tigre, which is a short train ride from Buenos Aires.

Dumas was the inspiration for an Argentine tango entitled Navegante, written by Jaime Yanin (music) and José Horacio Staffolani (lyrics). It was recorded in Buenos Aires on 5 August 1943 by the Orquesta típica of Carlos di Sarli, featuring Roberto Rufino on vocals.

References

 

 Vito Dumas "La Leyenda continua......." Sitio Web del gran Navegante Argentino, dirigido por Jorge Mario Bertolino(in Spanish)

 
 Vito Dumas, argentino universal, uno de los más grandes navegantes solitarios de todos los tiempos(Spanish)
 Roberto Alonso - Ricardo Cufre "Testimonios de una leyenda" - 1995 - , page 284. 

1900 births
1965 deaths
Sportspeople from Buenos Aires
Argentine sailors
Burials at La Chacarita Cemetery
Single-handed circumnavigating sailors